Brand New Day is the tenth album by the band Blood, Sweat & Tears, released in November 1977. This was the band's only release on ABC Records. Brand New Day was produced by Roy Halee and former BS&T drummer Bobby Colomby. Colomby and Halee had also co-produced the group's fourth album, Blood, Sweat & Tears 4 in 1971. This collection failed to chart on the Billboard Album Charts in the top 200 even though it did reach #205 under the chart.

The group's lineup stayed constant between this album and 1976's More Than Ever with the exception of the departure of original BS&T drummer Bobby Colomby. Colomby had been the sole remaining original member of the group at the time of his departure in 1976. Roy McCurdy took over the drums beginning on this release.

This album has not been released on compact disc except for an unofficial version made in Russia in the early 2000s. The CD includes a sticker on the front that states "First time on CD! a 1977 studio album by Blood, Sweat and Tears digitally  from original LP", and three additional live tracks (I'll Drown In My Own Tears, Gimme That Wine, and Trouble In Mind / Shake A Hand) not on the original LP.

Reception

Writing for Allmusic, critic Jason Elias wrote, "For the most part, Brand New Day wasn't as innovative or as grand as previous releases, but fans will enjoy some of the better moments." Elias also stated "by 1977, the musical landscape had changed, so this is closer to R&B and polished pop, rather than the amalgam of styles that the group was famous for."

Track listing
Side one
 "Somebody I Trusted (Put Out the Light)" (Daniel Moore) – 3:56
 "Dreaming as One" (David Palmer, William Smith) – 4:10
 "Same Old Blues" (J.J. Cale) – 3:07
 "Lady Put Out The Light" (Guy Fletcher, Doug Flett) – 4:00
 "Womanizer" (Randy Sharp) – 3:50
Side two
 "Blue Street" (Randy Edelman) – 4:29
 "Gimme That Wine" (Jon Hendricks) – 5:00
 "Rock & Roll Queen (A Tribute to Janis Joplin)" (Bob Johnson, Phil Driscoll) – 5:10
 "Don't Explain" (Arthur Herzog, Jr., Billie Holiday) – 6:00
CD bonus tracks
 "I'll Drown in My Own Tears" (Live) (Henry Glover) - 10:18
 "Gimme That Wine" (Live) (Jon Hendricks) - 11:30
 "Trouble in Mind/Shake a Hand" (live) - 6:38

Personnel

David Clayton-Thomas – lead vocals
Roy McCurdy – drums
Mike Stern – guitar
Larry Willis – keyboards
Danny Trifan – bass guitar
Tony Klatka – trumpet, flugelhorn
Forest Buchtell – trumpet, flugelhorn
Dave Bargeron – trombone
Bill Tillman – saxophone

Additional Musicians

Chaka Khan – co-lead vocals on "Dreaming As One"
Tommy Morgan - harmonica
Pete Jolly – Mussette oboe
Bobby Colomby – percussion, vocals
Paul Shure – strings
Willie Smith – vocals, organ
Brenda Bryant, Carl Graves, Ernie Watts, Glen Garrett, John Gross, John Mitchell, John Rosenberg, King Errison, Mike Altshul, Mike Finnigan, Paul Stallworth, Peter Graves, Ray Reed, Bob Payne, Stu Blumberg, Tish Smith, Tom Peterson, Venetta Fields - choir

Production

Produced by Roy Halee and Bobby Colomby
Engineered by Roy Halee
Mastered By: Stan Ricker
Re-Mixed at: ABC Studios, Los Angeles
Recorded at: United Western Recording Studios, Los Angeles and Criteria Recording Studios, Miami

References 

Blood, Sweat & Tears albums
1977 albums
ABC Records albums
Albums produced by Roy Halee
Albums produced by Bobby Colomby